Sara Omar (born 21 August 1986 in Sulaymaniah, Kurdistan Region) is a Danish-Kurdish author, human rights activist and poet. She is the first internationally recognized female novelist from Kurdistan Region of Iraq. She started out as a poet and has published several critical articles in the Middle Eastern media.

Sara Omar grew up in Kurdistan Region but became a refugee from war in the late 1990s. She has lived in Denmark since 2001. She previously studied law before switching to political science, where she holds a bachelor's degree and is currently studying for a master's degree.

Sara Omar’s breakthrough novel Dødevaskeren (Dead Washer) was published in November 2017. Two years later, a sequel, Skyggedanseren (Shadow Dancer), was published.

Early life and education 
Sara Omar was born in 1986 in the city of Sulaymaniah in Kurdistan. She grew up during the Iran-Iraq War (1980-1988), which developed into the Iraq-Kuwait conflict (1990-1991), also known as the Gulf War. She lived in the neighboring town of Halabja during the poison gas attack on March 16, 1988.

Sara Omar lived in Kurdistan during the Anfal campaign, the genocide against the Kurds, in the late 1980s. Many of her relatives fell victim to the war, which lasted from 1986 to 1989. This war serves as the backdrop for Sara Omar’s novels.

Because of the war, she had to flee Kurdistan at a young age, coming to Denmark as a 15-year-old, where she finished her secondary schooling and began university.

Career

Early authorship 
Sara Omar has been writing poems and painting from childhood. In 2012, she participated in WEYA, an international festival for 1,000 of the world's most talented young poets from 100 different countries. Sara Omar tried to publish her literary works in the Middle East but was rejected. For many years she wrote under a pseudonym, pretending to be a man.

Since 2004, Sara Omar has written poetry and critical essays in the Middle Eastern media on female genital mutilation, incest, sexual assault, honor crimes, honor killings, social control, oppression of women, and the rights of homosexuals, the disabled, children and women in patriarchal societies.

Before her breakthrough novels were published, Sara Omar published a poem in the literary magazine Kritiker in 2014, entitled "The River of Pain That Continues Its Wandering".

She also contributed the poem Barndommens tavshed (Childhood Silence) in the anthology Ord på flugt (Words on the run), published by Danish PEN. The anthology was written by authors and journalists who had all fled war-torn countries.

Literature and Cultural Engagement 
On 30 November 2017, Sara Omar's debut novel Dødevaskeren was published, for which she received the Readers' Book Prize. The debut novel has sold over 100,000 copies, of which 50,000 were sold in the first month after publication.

Two years later, on 26 November 2019, the sequel Skyggedanseren was published, which was awarded the booksellers' literature prize, De Gyldne Laurbær. Within two months, it sold 50,000 copies.

Both of Sara Omar's novels are published by Politikens Forlag, and they have been translated into Swedish, Norwegian, Serbian, Macedonian and French.

In 2019, Sara Omar opened the Danish literary event Bogforum in Bellacenteret, Copenhagen, and has given the opening speech at CPH:DOX in 2020. Sara Omar has also participated and given readings at several literature festivals, including Bogforum, Litt Talk, Ordkraft, Litterature Exchange and international SILK in Skudeneshavn in Norway. She has performed for Politiken Live, Louisiana Live, at Huset Zornig and with Jan Grarup at the Royal Danish Theater.

In 2020, 'the dead washer' was published in France. Le Point soon claimed the book as one of the 30 most important publications in France in 2020.

Human Rights activism 
Sara Omar has participated in many events focusing on vulnerable people and victims of violence. She has given presentations on honor-related crimes, sexual liberation, and negative social control for the Nordic Federation of Societies of Obstetrics and Gynecology, on her novel Dødevaskeren at the Anonymity of Violence event for the Umbrella Organization Intercultural Women's Council and the Tingbjerg Women's Association Eves Univers, at the Danish United Nations Association on what Denmark must fight for on the UN Commission on Women, and at Mino Denmark for International Women's Day.

She has appeared in campaigns for Amnesty International and for Danner, where she participated in the "Life after Violence" project on abused and vulnerable children and women.

She is an ambassador for DIGNITY - the Danish Institute against Torture, the Danish Women's Society, the youth organization Crossing Borders and the Swedish organization GAPF, which fights honor-related violence.

Shortly after the release of Dødevaskeren, Sara Omar was invited to give a New Year's speech in Deadline on DR2, where she focused on the violent world in which some Muslim women live.

Sara Omar sits on the Expert Advisory Panel for the Arts & Globalization Communication Group.

Awards 
Sara Omar has received numerous awards for her literature. This includes the Erik Hoffmeyer's travel grant in 2015, the Ytringsfrihedsprisen (Freedom of Speech Award) in 2018, Victor of the Year 2018, and the Artbeat award in 2018.

In 2018, Sara Omar won the Readers' Book Prize for Dødevaskeren, and the 2019 De Gyldne Laurbær for Skyggedanseren. In 2019, she received the Danish Institute for Human Rights' Human Rights Award, her speech later published as a column in Jyllands-Posten.

In 2019, she received the Martin Andersen Nexø Foundation's literary prize together with Sofie Jama and Aydin Soei. The three authors received the award because they each "represent voices that will develop and shape the immigrant debate and help change the understanding of migration both from within and without." In addition, Sara Omar received the 2019 ELLE Style Awards as Woman of the Year " for his best-selling novel The Death Washer, which unveils a man-chauvinistic culture that has taken Islam hostage".

Omar was awarded the 2019 Human Rights Prize, by The Danish Institute For Human Rights.

Her novel Skyggedanseren won De Gyldne Laurbær in 2020.

Bibliography

Magazines, newspapers and debates 
	Den konfliktfyldte unge i et samfund, der er ligeglad. The Voices. 2006.

Literature 
	The poem Floden af smerte, der fortsætter sin vandring, from the Swedish anthology "Ett inskränkt öde och ett besinningslöst". KRITIKER. 2014. No. 33. .
	The poem Barndommens tavshed from the anthology "Ord på flugt". Dansk PEN. 2016. 
	Dødevaskeren. Politikens Forlag. 2017. 
	Skyggedanseren. Politikens Forlag. 2019.

References

External links 

 politikensforlag.dk om Dødevaskeren
 politikensforlag.dk om Sara Omar

1986 births
Living people
People from Kurdistan Province
21st-century Danish poets
Danish women poets
Danish women novelists
21st-century Danish novelists
21st-century Danish women writers
Iraqi emigrants to Denmark